This is a list of ambassadors of the United States to Serbia.

Some parts of today's Serbia had been under the occupation of the Ottoman Empire (from 1459 until 1804) while other parts were occupied by Habsburg monarchy (1526–1804), Austrian Empire (1804–1867), and Austria-Hungary (1867-1918). Upon regaining its independence (partial in 1804 and full in 1878), the Serbian state strengthened and expanded and was in 1918 the driving force behind the creation of Yugoslavia (the land of South Slavs, a multi-ethnic state that over the following seven decades experienced various models of governance). In 1992 Yugoslavia disintegrated, although two of its constituent units - Serbia and Montenegro - continued in the same federal state under the same name Yugoslavia until 2003, when they re-organized into Serbia-Montenegro. After the Montenegrin independence referendum in May 2006, Serbia, as the only remaining unit in the federation, also became independent on 5 June 2006.

The United States established diplomatic relations with Serbia on November 10, 1882 when Eugene Schuyler was appointed resident U.S. Ambassador to Serbia, Romania and Greece, in Athens.

Since July 17, 1919, U.S. diplomatic missions were based in Yugoslavia and since May 1992 after the breakup of Socialist Federal Republic of Yugoslavia, Serbia – United States relations cooled off, were severed after the 1999 NATO bombing of Yugoslavia. The U.S. Embassy formally reopened in Belgrade in May 2001.

The United States Embassy in Serbia is located in Belgrade.

Ambassadors

Notes

See also
Serbia – United States relations
Foreign relations of Serbia
Ambassadors of the United States

References
United States Department of State: Background notes on Serbia

External links
 United States Department of State: Chiefs of Mission for Serbia
 United States Department of State: Serbia
 United States Embassy in Belgrade

Serbia

United States